John Loret (November 28, 1928 – August 13, 2011) was an American marine biologist and explorer.

Loret was born in Albany, New York in 1928. He served in the United States Coast Guard from 1946 to 1949.
He studied at the New York University and was admitted to the degree of Doctor of Philosophy at the University of Connecticut in 1974.

Loret was the President of The Explorers Club from 1993 to 1996.

References

1928 births
2011 deaths
American marine biologists
New York University alumni
University of Connecticut alumni